A Famosa ("The Famous" in Portuguese, also known as Fortaleza Velha Portuguese: the old fortress, and Dutch: Slavenburgh (slave castle) & De Misericorde (Our Lady of Mercy, from French: Notre Dame de Miséricorde) was a Portuguese fortress built in Malacca, Malaysia, in 1512. The oldest part of the fortress was a five-storey keep which gave its name to the fortress as a whole. Some time following the Battle of Malacca (1641) and the occupation of the city by the Dutch, the keep was destroyed but the outer walls of the fortress were reinforced. However, in 1807 the British destroyed most of the fortress. The Porta de Santiago gateway, and the restored Middelburg Bastion, are the only parts of the fortress that remain today. They are among the oldest European architectural remains in Southeast Asia and the Far East.

History

In 1511, a Portuguese fleet arrived under the command of Afonso de Albuquerque. His forces attacked and defeated the armies of the Malacca Sultanate. Moving quickly to consolidate his gains, Albuquerque had the fortress built around a natural hill near the sea. Albuquerque believed that Malacca would become an important port linking Portugal to the Spice Route in China. At this time other Portuguese were establishing outposts in such places as Macau, China and Goa, India to create a string of friendly ports for ships heading to Ming China and returning home to Portugal.

The fortress once consisted of long ramparts and four major towers. One of the towers was a 60-m tall four-storey keep, known as A Famosa ('The Famous'), which was the tallest building in the region from 1512 until it was destroyed by the Dutch in 1641.  Other parts of the fortress included an ammunition storage room, the residence of the captain, and an officers' quarters. There were also town houses inside the fortress walls. As Malacca's population expanded it outgrew the original fort and extensions were added around 1586.

The fort changed hands in 1641 when the Dutch drove the Portuguese out of Malacca.  The Dutch renovated the gate in 1670, which explains the logo "ANNO 1670" inscribed on the gate's arch. Above the arch is a bas-relief logo of the Dutch East India Company.

The fortress changed hands again in the late 18th century when the Dutch handed it over to the British to prevent it from falling into the hands of Napoleon's expansionist France. The English were wary of maintaining the fortification and ordered its destruction in 1806. The fort was almost totally demolished but for the timely intervention of Sir Stamford Raffles, the founder of modern Singapore, who was sent on sick leave from Penang to Malacca in 1807. It was Captain William Farquhar, tasked with the destruction of the fort and town, who decided to save two of the gateways to the fort, including the Santiago Gate, as well as the Stadthuys, church and jail.

Partial restoration
In late November 2006, a part of the fort, believed to be the Middelburg Bastion, was accidentally uncovered during the construction of 110 meter revolving tower in Malacca Town. The construction of the tower was ceased and its site was subsequently shifted to the popular district of Bandar Hilir on Jalan Merdeka where it was officially opened to the public on 18 April 2008. Malacca Museums Corporation suspects the structure was built by the Dutch during the Dutch occupation of Malacca from 1641 to 1824. Earlier in June 2004, a watchtower named Santiago Bastion was discovered during the construction of Dataran Pahlawan. In 2006-2007 the Middelburg Bastion was restored.

Gallery

References

Notations

External links

 Tourism Malaysia - St.Paul's Hill
 Description of the fort during English rules by Hikayat Abdullah.

Buildings and structures in Malacca City
Forts in Malaysia
Portuguese forts
Portuguese Malacca
Tourist attractions in Malacca
1511 establishments in Portuguese Malacca
1641 disestablishments in Portuguese Malacca
Portuguese colonial architecture in Malaysia